Jönköping Municipality is a municipality in Jönköping County, southern Sweden. The city of Jönköping is the municipal seat. The municipality is situated by the southern end of lake Vättern.

Historical background
The area of the present municipality consists of more than 20 original municipal entities, among them three former cities. In 1952 the number of units was reduced to 13. The present municipality was created in connection with the nationwide local government reform of 1971.

Localities
There are 17 urban areas (also called a Tätort or locality) in Jönköping Municipality.

In the table the localities are listed according to the size of the population as of December 31, 2015. The municipal seat is in bold characters.

Sport
International Floorball Federation was founded in the eastern part of Jönköping, in Huskvarna, 1986.

Twin towns – sister cities

Jönköping is twinned with:
 Bodø, Norway
 Kuopio, Finland
 Lääne-Viru County, Estonia
 Svendborg, Denmark
 Tianjin, China

See also
Municipalities of Sweden
Swedish National Board of Agriculture
List of Jönköping Governors

References

Statistics Sweden

External links

Jönköping Municipality - Official site
Coat of arms

 
Jönköping
Municipalities of Jönköping County
1971 establishments in Sweden